The Saint Leo Lions are the athletic teams that represent Saint Leo University, located in Saint Leo, in NCAA Division II intercollegiate sports. The Lions compete in the Sunshine State Conference, and have 20 varsity sports. They have been members of the SSC since its founding in 1975.

History
The Saint Leo Lions have won 27 Sunshine State Conference Championships  and have had 106 NCAA Championship Appearances  as of April 2020. Saint Leo has finished inside the top-80 out of 307 NCAA Division II institutions in the Learfield Directors' Cup in six straight years with two top-five finishes including second overall in 2015-16. The Lions have been the top SSC institutions in three years, 2014–15, 2015–16, and 2017–18. The Learfield Directors' Cup reflects the overall depth and strength of a university's athletics program based on NCAA Championship participation and advancement.

National Champions
1 Team: Men's Golf (2016) 

3 Individuals: Hugo Bernard (2016, Men's Golf), Marie Coors (2017, Women's Golf), Henrik Dahrendorff (2019, Men's Swimming)

Hugo Bernard became the first-ever national champion in the history of the university, team or individual, on May 19, 2016 when he won at the Green Valley Ranch Golf Club in Denver, Colorado. 
The Saint Leo Men's Golf team became the first-ever team national champions when they claimed the team title on May 21, 2016 in Denver, Colorado.
Marie Coors became the first-ever female to win a national title in school history on May 20, 2017 at the Findlay Country Club in Findlay, Ohio. 
Henrik Dahrendorff became the first national champion in swimming program history on March 16, 2019 in Indianapolis, Indiana.

Varsity teams

Facilities

Marion Bowman Activities Center
The Bowman Center arena has two full basketball and volleyball courts and can seat as many as 1,500 spectators for an event in cushioned, seat-back chairs. During the summer of 2012 the floor was completely replaced, resurfaced, and repainted. A new energy efficient lighting system was installed before the 2009-10 school year. The Activities Center houses four classrooms, eight locker rooms and the athletic department offices. In addition, the fitness center was refurbished over the summer of 2012 featuring the latest in work out equipment for both weight training and aerobics. This impressive and spacious training/weight facility is located in the former bowling alley in the lower level of the Activities Center.

Thomas B. Southard Stadium
Replacing Dade City Park in the 1970s as the Home of the Lions and named after the college's fifth president, the oldest outdoor facility on the Saint Leo campus is complemented by a major-league caliber lighting system installed in 1987, automatic sprinklers, drainage system, press box, and a wireless scoreboard with LED videoboard. The stadium was fitted with OAI-produced windscreens in 2009, and is widely accepted as one of the premier baseball complexes in the Sunshine State Conference.

References

External links